Thomas Lindsay Blanton (October 25, 1872 – August 11, 1957) was a United States Representative from Texas from 1917 to 1929, then again from 1930 to 1937. He was a member of the Democratic Party.

Biography
Born in Houston, Texas, Blanton was educated in the public schools.  He graduated from the law department of the University of Texas at Austin in 1897, with three years in the academic department.  He was admitted to the bar in 1897 and commenced practice in Cleburne.  He moved to Albany, Texas, and continued the practice of law until 1908, when he was elected judge of the 42nd Judicial District of Texas. He was reelected in 1912 and served in that capacity until he was elected to Congress in 1916.

Blanton was elected as a Democrat to the Sixty-fifth and to the five succeeding Congresses (March 4, 1917 – March 3, 1929).

Censure
While a member of the House of Representatives of the Sixty-seventh Congress, Blanton inserted into the Congressional Record a letter purporting to have been written by one Millard French, a non-union printer, to "George H. Carter, Public Printer"; the letter recited a conversation reported to have occurred between French and a printer named Levi Huber who belonged to the union.  The letter was said to contain language that was "unspeakable, vile, foul, filthy, profane, blasphemous and obscene", in the words of Representative Franklin Mondell, and the House voted to expunge the letter from the Congressional Record, on a vote of 313 to 1.

The letter itself was an affidavit sent by an employee of the Public Printer on September 3, 1921, and relates to the Government Printing Office. A selection of the letter, which relates what Levi Huber, the corrector of revises, said to the employee:

G__d D___n your black heart, you ought to have it torn out of you, you u s_ of a b_. You and the Public Printer has no sense. You k_ his a and he is a d_d fool for letting you do it.      

Robert D. Stevens of the University of Hawaii at Manoa wrote in a 1982 article that the offending remarks "were not all that offensive by today's standards," and only took up half a column of the Record, and furthermore contained only 32 "obscene" words, which were already censored in the form of removing most of the letters and replacing them with underscores.

A motion to expel Blanton failed by only eight votes, and he was unanimously censured by the House of Representatives on October 27, 1921, for "abuse of leave to print."  Mondell, the author of the expulsion resolution, claimed on the floor of the House of Representatives that "There is not a member who will not say that it is the vilest thing he has ever seen in print", and that "Any one speaking the words contained in the Congressional Record would be subject to fine and imprisonment under the laws of the land."  Representative Finis Garrett, defending Blanton, insisted Blanton had "no intention of being indecent but merely [had] a desire to show a condition existing between organized and non-organized labor in the printing office."

Subsequent events
The censure motion did not appear to harm Blanton's reputation with his constituents and he was re-elected to the House in 1922, 1924, and 1926.  He was not a candidate for renomination in 1928 but was an unsuccessful candidate for nomination to the United States Senate.

Return to Congress 
Blanton was subsequently elected on May 20, 1930, to the Seventy-first Congress to fill the vacancy caused by the death of his House successor, Robert Q. Lee, who died little more than a year after taking office.  He was re-elected to the Seventy-second, Seventy-third, and Seventy-fourth Congresses and served from May 20, 1930, to January 3, 1937.  He was an unsuccessful candidate for renomination in 1936.

He engaged in the practice of law in Washington, D.C., in 1937 and 1938.  He returned to Albany, Texas, in 1938, and continued practicing law.  He also engaged in the raising of Hereford cattle.

He died in Albany in 1957 and is interred there at Albany Cemetery. He was a brother of Annie Webb Blanton (1870-1945), a two-term Texas state superintendent of public instruction and a former president of the Texas State Teachers Association, who lived most of her adult years in Denton.

See also
List of federal political scandals in the United States
List of United States representatives expelled, censured, or reprimanded

References

Sources

 Biography in the Handbook of Texas Online

|-

|-

1872 births
1957 deaths
Censured or reprimanded members of the United States House of Representatives
Democratic Party members of the United States House of Representatives from Texas
Obscenity controversies
People from Albany, Texas
People from Houston
Texas lawyers
Texas state court judges
University of Texas School of Law alumni